The Reverend Father Gregory Martin (c. 1542 – 28 October 1582) was an English Catholic priest, a noted scholar of his time, academic and Doctor of Divinity, and served as the chief translator of the Rheims and Douai Version of the Bible, the first full, official Catholic English Bible translation, translated from the Latin Vulgate.

In preparing the translation he was assisted by several of the other scholars then living in the English College, Douai, the most noteworthy of which were Thomas Worthington, Richard Bristowe, William Rainolds (Reynolds), and William Cardinal Allen, but Father Martin made the whole translation in the first instance and bore the brunt of the work throughout.

Life

He was born in Maxfield, a parish of Guestling, near Winchelsea, in Sussex, an historic county of South East England, and entered as one of the original scholars of St John's College, Oxford, in 1557. Among those who also entered at the beginning was Edmund Campion, the Jesuit martyr; at this period of his life, he conformed to the Established Anglican Church, and was ordained as a deacon. Campion was Martin's close friend throughout his Oxford days, and he remained a Catholic.

When he found it necessary to quit the university, he was tutor in the family of the Duke of Norfolk, where he had among his pupils Philip, Earl of Arundel, also subsequently martyred. During his residence with the Duke, Martin wrote to Campion, warning him that he was being led away into danger by his ambition, and begging him to leave Oxford. It is said that it was in great measure due to this advice that Campion migrated to Dublin in 1570, and accepted a post in the university there.

In the meantime, Gregory Martin left the house of the Duke of Norfolk, and crossing the seas, presented himself at Dr Allen's College at Douai as a candidate for the priesthood, in 1570. During his early days there, he wrote once more to Campion, and they met at Douai. Campion was now a professed Catholic, and he received minor orders and the subdiaconate, after which he proceeded to Rome and eventually entered the Society of Jesus.

Having finished his theology, Gregory Martin was ordained priest in March 1573. Three years later he went to Rome to assist Allen in the foundation of the English College there, known by the title of the "Venerabile." Martin remained two years, during which time he organised the course of studies at the new college; when he was recalled by Allen to Reims, where the college had moved from Douai in consequence of political troubles. Martin and Campion met for the last time, when the latter made a short stay at Reims in the summer of 1580, on his way to the English Mission.

It was during the four years after his return to Reims from Rome (1578–1582) that Father Martin settled to a Catholic translation of the Bible. The Reformers continually quoted their versions; Allen wanted to meet them on their own ground. He determined to attempt the work at his college, and deputed Martin to undertake the translation. Thomas Worthington, Richard Bristow, William Rainolds, and Allen himself were to assist in revising the text and preparing suitable notes to the passages which were most used by the Protestants.

It was accuracy of rendering which was chiefly needed by the controversial exigencies of the day. Martin's translation was made from the Vulgate, and is full of Latinisms, so that it has little of the rhythmic harmony of the Anglican Authorized Version: but in accuracy and scholarship, it was superior to the English versions which had preceded it, and it is understood to have had influence on the translators of King James's Version. In many cases in which they did not follow the Douai, the editors of the Revised Version have upheld Martin's translation.

The Reims New Testament first appeared in 1582. The Old Testament was not published till more than a quarter of a century later. This, however, was solely due to want of funds. It was not called for with such urgency, and its publication was put off from year to year. But it was all prepared at the same time as the New Testament, and by the same editors.

Father Martin was found to be in consumption, a lethal form of tuberculosis. In the hope of saving his life, Allen sent him to Paris, but the disease was past cure. He returned to Reims to die, and he was buried in the parish church of St Stephen. Allen preached the funeral discourse, and had a long Latin inscription put on the tomb of his friend.

The English Catholic printer William Carter was executed in 1584 for having printed Martin's "A Treatise of Schisme". A paragraph in which Martin expressed confidence that "the Catholic Hope would triumph, and pious Judith would slay Holofernes" was interpreted as an incitement to slay Queen Elizabeth I, though in all likelihood this paragraph was just a metaphor representing the Holy Mother Church as Judith slaying the perceived heretics, the Protestants.

Works

The following is a list of Martin's works: 
"Treatise of Schisme" (Douai, 1578)
"Discovery of the Manifold Corruptions of the Holy Scripture by the Heretikes of our Daies" (Reims, 1582)
Reims Testament and Douai Bible (Reims, 1582 and Douai, 1609/1610)
"Treatise of Christian Peregrination" (Reims, 1583)
"Of the Love of the Soul" (St Omer, 1603)
"Gregorius Martinus ad Adolphum Mekerchum pro veteri et vera Græcarum Literarum Pronunciatione" (Oxford, 1712)
Several other works in manuscript mentioned by Pitts.

See also

Latin Vulgate
Catholic Bible
Bible translations into English
Douay Rheims Bible
University of Douai
The English College at Douai
Catholic Church in France
Reims, France

References

Edwin H. Burton, The Life and Times of Bishop Challoner, 2 Vols. (London, 1909) 
Charles Dodd, Church History of England 
John Pitts, De Illustribus Angliae Scriptoribus
Anthony à Wood, Athenae Oxoniensis
Thomas Francis Knox, First and Second Diaries of the English College, Douay: Historical Introduction (London, 1877) 
, Letters and Memorials of Cardinal Allen (London, 1882) 
Henry Foley, The Records of the English Province of the Society of Jesus
Richard Simpson, Edmund Campion (London, 1866; reissued, 1907)
Menology of St. Edmund's College (London, 1909)

Attribution
 

1540s births
1582 deaths
16th-century English Roman Catholic priests
English College, Douai alumni
English translators
British biblical scholars
16th-century translators
16th-century scholars
Alumni of St John's College, Oxford
People from Guestling